Mero Air was an airline based in Nepal.

History
The Civil Aviation Authority of Nepal granted Mero Air an air operators certificate in 2005. Despite this, by 2007 the airline had failed to start operations.

References

Defunct airlines of Nepal